Modern pentathlon at the Friendship Games took place in Warsaw, Poland between 5 and 9 August 1984. 45 athletes took part in two men's events (individual and team competition).

Events

Medal table

See also
 Modern pentathlon at the 1984 Summer Olympics

References

Friendship Games
Friendship Games
Friendship Games
Friendship Games
International sports competitions hosted by Poland
Sports competitions in Warsaw